Minor Threat was an American hardcore punk band, formed in 1980 in Washington, D.C., by vocalist Ian MacKaye and drummer Jeff Nelson.  MacKaye and Nelson had played in several other bands together, and recruited bassist Brian Baker and guitarist Lyle Preslar to form Minor Threat.  They added a fifth member, Steve Hansgen, in 1982, playing bass, while Baker switched to second guitar.

The band was relatively short-lived, disbanding after only three years together, but had a strong influence on the punk scene, both stylistically and in establishing a "do it yourself" ethic for music distribution and concert promotion. Minor Threat's song "Straight Edge" became the eventual basis of the straight edge movement, which emphasized a lifestyle without alcohol or other drugs, or promiscuous sex. AllMusic described Minor Threat's music as "iconic" and noted that their groundbreaking music "has held up better than [that of] most of their contemporaries."

Along with the fellow Washington, D.C. hardcore band Bad Brains and California band Black Flag, Minor Threat set the standard for many hardcore punk bands in the 1980s and 1990s. All of Minor Threat's recordings were released on MacKaye's and Nelson's own label, Dischord Records. The Minor Threat EP and their only full-length studio album Out of Step have received a number of accolades and are cited as landmarks of the hardcore punk genre.

History

Formation and early years

Prior to forming Minor Threat in 1980, vocalist Ian MacKaye and drummer Jeff Nelson had played bass and drums respectively in the Teen Idles while attending what was then Wilson High School. During their two-year career within the flourishing Washington D.C. hardcore punk scene, the Teen Idles had gained a following of around one hundred fans (a sizable amount at the time), and were seen as only second within the scene to the contemporary Bad Brains. MacKaye and Nelson were strong believers in the DIY mentality and an independent, underground music scene. After the breakup of the Teen Idles, they used the money earned through the band to create Dischord Records, an independent record label that would host the releases of the Teen Idles, Minor Threat, and numerous other D.C. punk bands.

Eager to start a new band after the Teen Idles, MacKaye and Nelson recruited guitarist Lyle Preslar and bassist Brian Baker. They played their first performance in December 1980 to fifty people in a basement, opening for Bad Brains, The Untouchables, Black Market Baby and S.O.A., all D.C. bands.

The band's first 7-inch EPs, Minor Threat and In My Eyes, were released in 1981. The group became popular regionally and toured the east coast and Midwest.

"Straight Edge," a song from the band's first EP, helped to inspire the straight edge movement. The lyrics of the song relay MacKaye's first-person perspective of his personal choice of abstinence from alcohol and other drugs, a novel ideology for rock musicians which initially found a small but dedicated following. Other prominent groups that subsequently advocated the straight edge stance include SS Decontrol and 7 Seconds. Although the original song was not written as a manifesto or a "set of rules," many later bands inspired by this idea used it as such, and over the years since its release, the song and the term "straight edge" became the zeitgeist for an entire subculture, and indeed the basis for a paradigm shift that has persisted and grown consistently throughout the world. The term comes as the point of the story—he doesn't want to do drugs or drink, so therefore the writer has an edge over those who do—a straight edge.

"Out of Step", a Minor Threat song from their second EP, further demonstrates the said belief: "Don't smoke/Don't drink/Don't fuck/At least I can fucking think/I can't keep up/I'm out of step with the world." The "I" in the lyrics was usually only implied, mainly because it did not quite fit the rhythm of the song. Some of the other members of Minor Threat, Jeff Nelson in particular, took exception to what they saw as MacKaye's imperious attitude on the song. The song was later re-recorded, and the updated version of the song on the 1983 album Out of Step, which is slower so the first-person use of "I" would be clearer, included a bridge where MacKaye explains his personal beliefs, explaining that his ideals, which at the time were not yet known as what became a collective philosophy, or in fact, known as "straight edge," "is not a set of rules; I'm not telling you what to do. All I'm saying is there are three things, that are like so important to the whole world that I don't happen to find much importance in, whether it's fucking, or whether it's playing golf, because of that, I feel... I can't keep up... (full chorus)". 

Minor Threat's song "Guilty of Being White" led some critics to accuse the band of racism, but MacKaye has strongly denied such intentions and said that some listeners misinterpreted his words. He claims that his experiences attending Wilson High School, whose student population was 70 percent Black, inspired the song. There, many students bullied MacKaye and his friends. In an interview, MacKaye stated that he was offended that some perceived racist overtones in the lyrics, saying, "To me, at the time and now, it seemed clear it's an anti-racist song. Of course, it didn't occur to me at the time I wrote it that anybody outside of my twenty or thirty friends who I was singing to would ever have to actually ponder the lyrics or even consider them." Thrash metal band Slayer later covered the song, with the last iteration of the lyric "guilty of being white" changed to "guilty of being right."

Hiatus
In the time between the release of the band's second seven-inch EP and the Out of Step record, the band briefly split when guitarist Lyle Preslar moved to Illinois to attend college for a semester at Northwestern University. Preslar was a member of Big Black for a few tempestuous rehearsals. During that period, MacKaye and Nelson put together a studio-only project called Skewbald/Grand Union; in a reflection of the slowly increasing disagreements between the two musicians, they were unable to decide on one name. The group recorded three untitled songs, which would be released posthumously as Dischord's 50th release. During Minor Threat's inactive period, Brian Baker also briefly played guitar for Government Issue and appeared on the Make an Effort EP.

In March 1982, at the urging of Bad Brains' H.R., Preslar left college to reform Minor Threat. The reunited band featured an expanded lineup: Steve Hansgen joined as the band's bassist and Baker switched to second guitar.

Some in Minor Threat, particularly drummer Jeff Nelson, took exception to what they saw as MacKaye's imperious attitude on the song "Out of Step." When the song was re-recorded for the LP Out of Step, MacKaye clearly sang "I don't drink/smoke/fuck" (as was the intent of his words all along). The band also inserted an overdubbed spoken section into the instrumental break before the last chorus with MacKaye stating, "This is not a set of rules, I'm not telling you what to do..." Recording engineer Don Zientara had inadvertently recorded an argument between drummer Nelson and lyricist/singer MacKaye that captured the message perfectly, so this was used. According to Mark Andersen and Mark Jenkins' Dance of Days: Two Decades of Punk in the Nation's Capital, this argument was over exactly what would be said in the message that Nelson wanted MacKaye to record, stating essentially what he said without knowing it was being recorded. An ideological door had already been opened, however, and by 1983, some straight-edge punks, such as followers of the band SS Decontrol, were swatting beers out of people's hands at clubs.

Breakup

Minor Threat broke up in 1983. A contributing factor was disagreement over musical direction. MacKaye was allegedly skipping rehearsal sessions towards the end of the band's career, and he wrote the lyrics to the songs on the Salad Days EP in the studio. That was quite a contrast with the earlier recordings, as he had written and co-written the music for much of the band's early material. Minor Threat, which had returned to being a four-piece group with the departure of Hansgen, played its final show on September 23, 1983, at the Lansburgh Cultural Center in Washington, D.C., sharing the bill with go-go band Trouble Funk, and Austin, Texas punk funk act the Big Boys. In a meaningful way, Minor Threat ended their final set with "Last Song", a tune whose name was also the original title of the band's song "Salad Days".

Following the breakup, MacKaye stated that he did not "check out" on hardcore, but in fact hardcore "checked out". Explaining this, he stated that at a 1984 Minutemen show, a fan struck MacKaye's younger brother Alec in the face, and he punched the fan back, then realizing that the violence was "stupid," and that he saw his role in the stupidity. MacKaye claimed that immediately after this he decided to leave the hardcore scene.

Subsequent activities
In March 1984, six months after the band broke up, the EPs Minor Threat and In My Eyes were compiled together and re-released as the Minor Threat album. The Complete Discography archival compilation would follow in 1989, with the additional release of First Demo Tape in 2003. Two previously unreleased songs were featured on the 20 Years of Dischord compilation in 2002.

MacKaye went on to found Embrace with former members of the Faith, Egg Hunt with Jeff Nelson, and later Fugazi, the Evens, and Coriky, as well as collaborating on Pailhead.

Baker went on to play in Junkyard, the Meatmen, Dag Nasty and Government Issue. Since 1994, Baker has been a member of Bad Religion.

Preslar was briefly a member of Glenn Danzig's Samhain, and his playing appears on a few songs on the band's first record.  He joined The Meatmen in 1984, along with fellow Minor Threat member Brian Baker.  He later ran Caroline Records, signing and working with (among others) Peter Gabriel, Ben Folds, Chemical Brothers, and Idaho, and ran marketing for Sire Records. He graduated from Rutgers University School of Law and lives in New Jersey.

Nelson played less-frantic alternative rock with Three and The High-Back Chairs before retiring from live performance. He runs his own label, Adult Swim Records, distributed by Dischord, and is a graphic artist and a political activist in Toledo, Ohio. The band's own Dischord Records released material by many bands from the Washington, D.C., area, such as Government Issue, Void, Scream, Fugazi, Artificial Peace, Rites of Spring, Gray Matter, and Dag Nasty, and has become a respected independent record label.

Hansgen formed Second Wind with Rich Moore, a former Minor Threat roadie and drummer for the Untouchables. In 1992, he worked as a producer on the first Tool EP Opiate.

Copyright issues

"Major Threat"
In 2005, a mock-up of the cover of Minor Threat's first EP (also used on the Minor Threat LP and Complete Discography CD) was copied by athletic footwear manufacturer Nike for use on a promotional poster for a skateboarding tour called "Major Threat". Nike also altered Minor Threat's logo (designed by Jeff Nelson) for the same campaign, as well as featuring Nike shoes in the new picture, rather than the combat boots worn by Ian MacKaye's younger brother Alec on the original.

MacKaye issued a press statement condemning Nike's actions and said that he would discuss legal options with the other members of the band.  Meanwhile, fans, at the encouragement of Dischord, organized a letter-writing campaign protesting Nike's infringement. On June 27, 2005, Nike issued a statement apologizing to Minor Threat, Dischord Records, and their fans for the "Major Threat" campaign and said that all promotional artwork (print and digital) that they could acquire were destroyed.

"Salad Days"
On October 29, 2005, Fox played the first few seconds of Minor Threat's "Salad Days" during an NFL broadcast. Use of the song was not cleared by Dischord Records or any of the members of Minor Threat. Fox claimed that the clip was too short to have violated any copyrights.

Wheelhouse Pickles
In 2007, Brooklyn-based company Wheelhouse Pickles marketed a pepper sauce named "Minor Threat Sauce". Requesting only that the original label design (which was based on the "Bottled Violence" artwork) be amended, Ian MacKaye gave the product his endorsement. A small mention of this was made, where MacKaye commented “I don't have an occasion to eat a lot of hot sauce, but I also thought the Minor Threat stuff was nice.”

Urban Outfitters 
In 2013, Minor Threat shirts began appearing in Urban Outfitters stores. Ian MacKaye confirmed that the shirts were officially licensed. Having spent what he described as "a complete waste of time" trying to track down bootlegged Minor Threat merchandise, MacKaye and Dischord made arrangements with a merchandise company in California to manage licensing of the band's shirts, as well as working to ensure that bootleg manufacturers of the shirts were curtailed. In comments that appeared in Rolling Stone, MacKaye called it "absurd" for the shirts to be sold for $28 but concluded that "my time is better spent doing other things" than dealing with shirts. Dischord had previously taken action against Forever 21 in 2009 for marketing unlicensed Minor Threat shirts.

Members
 Ian MacKaye – lead vocals (1980–1983)
 Lyle Preslar – guitar (1980–1983)
 Brian Baker – bass (1980–1982, 1983); guitar (1982–1983)
 Jeff Nelson – drums (1980–1983)
 Steve Hansgen – bass (1982–1983)

Discography

Original material
 Minor Threat (EP, 1981)
 In My Eyes (EP, 1981)
 Out of Step (studio album, 1983)
 Salad Days (EP, 1985)

Compilation albums
 Minor Threat (1984)
 Complete Discography (1989)
 First Demo Tape (2003)

Compilation appearances
 Flex Your Head (1982) – "Stand Up", "12XU"
 Dischord 1981: The Year in Seven Inches (1995) contains the first two EPs
 20 Years of Dischord (2002) – "Screaming at a Wall", "Straight Edge" (live), "Understand", "Asshole Dub"

References

Further reading
 Andersen, Mark; Jenkins, Mark (Soft Skull Press, 2001). Dance of Days: Two Decades of Punk in the Nation's Capital. Fourth ed., 2009. Brooklyn, New York: Akashic Books. .
 Azerrad, Michael (2001), Our Band Could Be Your Life: Scenes From the American Indie Underground, 1981–1991, Boston, MA: Little Brown, .
 Connolly, Cynthia; Clague, Leslie & Cheslow, Sharon (1988), Banned in DC: Photos and Anecdotes from the DC Punk Underground 1979-85, Washington, D.C: Sun Dog Propaganda, .

External links
 
 
 Washington Post Express interview with Brian Baker, 2007
  from If This Goes On by Sharon Cheslow and Colin Sears

Alternative rock groups from Washington, D.C.
Dischord Records artists
Hardcore punk groups from Washington, D.C.
Musical groups established in 1980
Straight edge groups